Frederick J. Calvert was an English footballer who played as an inside right for Woolwich Arsenal in the Football League. He also played for the Army.

References

Sportspeople from Southend-on-Sea
English footballers
Arsenal F.C. players
English Football League players
Year of birth missing
Year of death missing
Association football inside forwards
People from Southend-on-Sea